The 1983 United Kingdom general election in Northern Ireland was held on 9 June with 17 MPs elected in single-seat constituencies using first-past-the-post as part of the wider general election in the United Kingdom. This was an increase of five seats, after the House of Commons (Redistribution of Seats) Act 1979 had come into effect to account for the reduced representation after direct rule had been imposed since 1972.

Results
The Conservative Party led by Margaret Thatcher as prime minister won another term in government.

The main beneficiaries of the increase of seats was the Ulster Unionist Party, now led by James Molyneaux. The SDLP lost a seat held by former leader Gerry Fitt to Gerry Adams of Sinn Féin, but the new SDLP leader John Hume gained a seat.

MPs elected

By-elections
In December 1985, all Unionist MPs resigned their seats in opposition to the Anglo-Irish Agreement and sought re-election in by-elections. These resulted in a loss of one seat to the SDLP

References

Northern Ireland
1983
1983 elections in Northern Ireland